Moneilema, or cactus longhorn beetles are a genus of large, flightless, black beetles found in North American deserts of the western United States and northern Mexico.  M. gigas is native to the Sonoran desert at elevations below 4900 feet (1500m).  The front wings of these beetles are fused forming a single, hardened shell, from which the genus derives its Latin name. The genus includes twenty species.

Longhorn cactus beetles feed on chollas and prickly pear cacti, and are known to feed on saguaro seedlings. Larvae bore into cactus roots and stems, sometimes killing more susceptible individuals. Adults also feed on the surface of cacti.

Most Moneilema species are active during mid or late summer - the adults typically emerging during the summer monsoon season. Some Moneilema species in central and southern Mexico are reported to be active all year.

Like many flightless beetles, these beetles have limited wing musculature with a rounded abdomen and thorax, similar in appearance to a number of other flightless desert beetles. Cactus longhorn beetles resemble and mimic the behavior of noxious stink beetles in the genus Eleodes.

Species
The genus includes 20 species:
Moneilema albopictum (White, 1856)
Moneilema annulatum (Say, 1824)
Moneilema appressum (LeConte, 1852)
Moneilema armatum (LeConte, 1853)
Moneilema aterrimum (Fisher, 1931)
Moneilema blapsides (Newman, 1838)
Moneilema crassipes (Fisher, 1931)
Moneilema ebeninum (Bates, 1885)
Moneilema gigas (LeConte, 1873)
Moneilema longipes (White, 1856)
Moneilema manni (Psota, 1930)
Moneilema mexicanum (Fisher, 1926)
Moneilema michelbacheri (Linsley, 1942)
Moneilema opuntiae (Fisher, 1928)
Moneilema punctipennis (Fisher, 1926)
Moneilema rugosissimum (Casey, 1924)
Moneilema semipunctatum (LeConte, 1852)
Moneilema subrugosum (Bland, 1862)
Moneilema variolare (Thomson, 1867)
Moneilema wickhami (Psota, 1930)

References

External links
Range expansions in the flightless longhorn cactus beetles
Evolutionary Consequences of Dispersal Ability in Cactus-feeding Insects

 
Beetles of North America
Cerambycidae genera